Wuhe Township is a township under the administration of Tengchong, Yunnan, China. , it has three residential communities and ten villages under its administration.
Communities
Wuhe Community
Lameng Community
Jintang Community

Villages
Lushan Village
Laozhai Village
Nanong Village
Xiangshan Village
Bingnong Village
Lianmeng Village
Zhengding Village
Tenglang Village
Huazhai Village
Guantian Village

References 

Township-level divisions of Baoshan, Yunnan
Tengchong
Townships of Yunnan